Bapska is a village in Croatia.

Geography

It is located south of Šarengrad (at the D2 highway) and north of Šid, Serbia.

Demographics

According to the 2011 census, Bapska had 928 inhabitants.

1991 census

1910 census

Note: Together with former settlement of Novak.

References

External links

Populated places in Vukovar-Syrmia County
Populated places in Syrmia
Ilok